Lazarus is the self-titled debut studio album by Texas band Lazarus. It was produced by Peter Yarrow and Phil Ramone, released in 1971 on the Bearsville Records label, and distributed by Warner Bros. Records. "Warmth of Your Eyes" was released as the first single in 1972. The album is considered one of the early albums of the Contemporary Christian movement.

Lazarus was released in the US, UK, Canada, Australia in 1971 and in Japan in 2016.

Background 
According to Peter Yarrow's liner notes, Lazarus band members Billie Hughes, Gary Dye and Carl Keesee attended a Peter, Paul and Mary concert in Abilene, Texas, after which they met Peter Yarrow and asked him to listen to their tape. They drove 20 minutes outside Abilene to a small farm house where, sitting on the floor with a single candle light, the band played their tape for Peter.

Yarrow invited Hughes, Dye and Keesee to Woodstock, New York, where they lived in his cabin and worked on their self-titled Lazarus album over a period of two years, with Phil Ramone joining them.

Lazarus was one of the first releases on Albert Grossman's Bearsville record label. In April 1972, a launch celebration in London with Albert Grossman in attendance, was hosted by Kinney (WEA), set to distribute the Bearsville label in the UK, with initial album releases by Todd Rundgren, Lazarus and Foghat.

Milton Glaser, designer of the poster for Bob Dylan's Greatest Hits and covers for Peter, Paul and Mary albums, designed the Lazarus album cover.

Critical reception 
Neal Vitale, The Tech wrote: "Lazarus comes off as one of the freshest, most pleasant albums released in quite awhile. Such cuts as the truly beautiful 'Looking Through,' 'Eastward,' and the hauntingly dark 'Rivers' all add up to an excellent first effort."

Apple Music: "filled with gorgeous vocal harmonies and understated yet stirring acoustic instrumental work. Lead singer Bill Hughes’ high, pure tenor serves as a perfect vehicle for the yearning and reverence embodied in his lyrics."

RPM wrote: "A find of PP&M's Peter Yarrow, Lazarus is a highly talented folkish trio very much in the strain of Crosby, Stills et al. Group has a quality of presence, unsurpassed. "River", "Baggage" and "Circuit Rider" get the nod."

Track listing

Personnel 
Lazarus
 Bill Hughes – vocals, guitar, violin
 Gary Dye – vocals, piano, organ
 Carl Keesee - vocals, bass

Production
 Cover (Design) – Milton Glaser
 Musical Director – Peter Yarrow
 Engineered, Mixed by Phil Ramone
 Photography – Benno Friedman
 Producer – Peter Yarrow, Phil Ramone
 Liner Notes – Peter Yarrow
 Recorded at A&R Studios, New York City

Cover versions 
In 1974, the Lettermen released "Eastward" as a single, reaching number 16 on the Billboard US Adult Contemporary chart.

"Blessed" is included in The Giant Book of Christian Sheet Music published by Alfred.

References 

1971 debut albums
Bearsville Records albums
Albums produced by Phil Ramone
Folk rock albums by American artists
Contemporary Christian music albums by American artists
Warner Music Group albums
Pony Canyon albums